Motunui (large island in Māori, from Motu Nui) is a settlement in northern Taranaki, in the North Island of New Zealand. It is located on State Highway 3 close to the shore of the North Taranaki Bight, six kilometres east of Waitara.

Methanol plant
Motunui is the location of the Motunui methanol plant, the largest in the world at the time of construction. It was opened in 1986 to convert natural gas to methanol and the methanol to synthetic petrol using a process developed by Mobil. The plant was one of the Think Big projects of the Third National Government. 

The process became uneconomic in the late 1990s as a result of falling oil prices, so the synthetic petrol part of the plant was decommissioned, with the production of synthetic petrol ceasing in April 1999. The plant instead produced methanol for export. Production of methanol ceased in 2004 as the approaching depletion of the Maui gas field raised gas prices.

In 2005, an unmanned production station for the new offshore Pohokura oil/gas field was constructed immediately west of the Motunui plant. This began commercial production in September 2006. In 2008, methanol train No.2 was recommissioned followed by train No.1 in 2012.

Currently owned and operated by Methanex, the plant's two trains have a total annual production capacity of 2.4 million tonnes of methanol.

References

New Plymouth
Populated places in Taranaki